Peter Robert Edwin Viereck (August 5, 1916 – May 13, 2006) was an American poet and professor of history at Mount Holyoke College. He won the Pulitzer Prize for Poetry in 1949 for the collection Terror and Decorum. In 1955 he was a Fulbright Scholar at the University of Florence.

Background
Viereck was born in New York City, the son of George Sylvester Viereck. He received his B.A. summa cum laude in history from Harvard University in 1937. He then specialized in European history, receiving his M.A. in 1939 and his Ph.D. in 1942, again from Harvard. Viereck was prolific in his writing from 1938. He published collections of poems, some first published in  Poetry Magazine. He won the annual Pulitzer Prize for Poetry in 1949 for the collection Terror and Decorum. In 1955 he was a Fulbright Scholar at the University of Florence.

Viereck first taught during 1946–1947 at Smith College. In 1948 he joined the faculty at nearby Mount Holyoke College, also a women's college in Massachusetts. He taught history for nearly fifty years. He retired in 1987 but continued to teach his Russian history survey course there until 1997.

Viereck died on May 13, 2006, in South Hadley, Massachusetts after a prolonged illness.

Politics
Viereck in the 1940s was an early leader in the conservative movement but by 1951 felt that it had strayed from true conservatism. This is reflected in his review of William F. Buckley's God and Man at Yale, The New York Times, November 4, 1951). In April 1940, Viereck wrote an article in the Atlantic Monthly ("But—I'm a Conservative!"), partly in reaction against the ideologies of his father, George Sylvester Viereck, a Nazi sympathizer.

His beliefs are difficult to categorize as they raise questions about what "conservative" really means:

According to Tom Reiss, Viereck was right, as he wrote in Conservatism Revisited (1949), that he "had 'opened people's minds to the idea that to be conservative is not to be satanic.' But, he said, 'once their minds were opened, Buckley came in'." In a review of Buckley's 1950 book God and Man at Yale, Viereck wrote:

In 1962 he elaborated upon the differences he saw between real conservatives and those he called pseudo-conservatives. He wrote of

In January 2006, Viereck offered this analysis:

Awards
 1949: Pulitzer Prize for Poetry for Terror and Decorum
 Guggenheim Fellowships in poetry and history

Works

In Poetry Magazine
"Graves Are Made to Waltz On," Volume 56, July 1940, Page 185
"Sonnet for Servants of the Word," Volume 68, September 1946, Page 302
"Vale," from Carthage, Volume 70, July 1947, Page 182
"Five Theological Cradle-Songs," Volume 71, December 1947, Page 115
"Better Come Quietly," Volume 71, December 1947, Page 115
"Why Can't I Live Forever?," Volume 71, December 1947, Page 115
"Blindman's Buff," Volume 71, December 1947, Page 115
"Game Called on Account of Darkness," Volume 71, December 1947, Page 115
"Hide and Seek," Volume 71, December 1947, Page 115
"A Sort of Redemption," Volume 72, August 1948, Page 238
"Elegy to All Sainthood Everywhere," Volume 72, August 1948, Page 238
"Love Song of Judas Smith," Volume 74, August 1949, Page 256
"Again, Again!," Volume 80, April 1952, Page 6
"Girl-Child Pastoral," Volume 81, October 1952, Page 80
"Nostalgia," Volume 82, April 1953, Page 18
"Benediction," Volume 85, February 1955, Page 255
"A Walk on Moss," Volume 87, October 1955, Page 1
"We Ran All the Way Home," Volume 96, August 1960, Page 265

Poetry collections
 1948: Terror and Decorum, winner of the Pulitzer Prize for Poetry in 1949
 1949: The Poet in the Machine Age
 1950: Strike Through the Mask! New Lyrical Poems
 1952: The First Morning, New Poems
 1953: Dream and Responsibility: Four Test Cases of the Tension Between Poetry and Society
 1954: The Last Decade in Poetry: New Dilemmas and New Solutions
 1956: The Persimmon Tree: new pastoral and lyrical poems
 1961: The Tree Witch: A Poem and Play (First of All a Poem)
 1967: New and Selected Poems: 1932-1967
 1987: Archer in the Marrow: The Applewood Cycles of 1967-1987
 1995: Tide and continuities: Last and First Poems, 1995-1938
 2005: Door: Poems
 2005: Strict Wildness: Discoveries In Poetry And History

Intellectual history
 1941. Meta-Politics: the Roots of the Nazi Mind, A. A. Knopf [Rep. by Capricorn Books, 1965].
 Metapolitics: From Wagner and the German Romantics to Hitler, Transaction Publishers, 2003.
 1949. Conservatism Revisited: The Revolt Against Ideology, Transaction Publishers [Rep. by The Free Press, 1962; expanded and revised edition, by Transaction Publishers, 2005, with a major new study of Peter Viereck and conservatism by Claes G. Ryn].
 1953. Dream and Responsibility: Four Test Cases of the Tension between Poetry and Society, University Press of Washington.
 1953. Shame and Glory of the Intellectuals, Beacon Press [Rep. by Capricorn Books, 1965; Greenwood Press, 1978; Transaction Publishers, 2006].
 1956. Conservatism: from John Adams to Churchill, Van Nostrand.
 Conservative Thinkers: From John Adams to Winston Churchill, Transaction Publishers, 2005.
 1956. The Unadjusted Man: A New Hero for Americans, Beacon Press [Rep. by. Greenwood Press, 1973].
 Unadjusted Man in the Age of Overadjustment: Where History and Literature Intersect, Transaction Publishers, 2004.
 1957. Inner Liberty: The Stubborn Grit in the Machine, Pendle Hill.
 2011. Strict Wildness: Discoveries in Poetry and History, Transaction Publishers.

Select articles
 "But—I'm a Conservative!", The Atlantic Monthly, April 1940.
 "On Conservatism: Two Notes," American Quarterly, Vol. 1, No. 3, Autumn, 1949.
 "Soviet-German Collaboration," The Forum, August 1949.
 "The Decline & Immortality of Europe," The Saturday Review, March 3, 1951.
 "Shame and Glory of the Intellectuals," The Reporter, May 27, 1952.
 "Sunrise in the West," The Saturday Review, June 12, 1954.
 "The New American Radicals," The Reporter, December 1954 Rep. in The American Conservative.
 "The Unadjusted Man," The Saturday Review, November 1, 1958.
 "The Crack-Up of American Optimism," Modern Age, Summer 1960.
 "The Split Personality of Soviet Literature," The Reporter, March 15, 1962.
 "Metapolitics Revisited," Humanitas, Volume XVI, No. 2, 2003.

References

Further reading
 Brown, Charles C. "Reading Peter Viereck Anew," The University Bookman, Volume 47, Number 3–4, Fall 2010.
 Ciardi, John. "Peter Viereck—The Poet and the Form." University of Kansas City Review 15: 297-302.
 Hayward, Ira N. "The Tall Ideas Dancing: Peter Viereck, or the Poet as Citizen." Western Humanities Review 9 (1955): 249-260.
 Henault, Marie. Peter Viereck (Twayne Publishers, 1969).
 Horowitz, Irving Louis. "Peter Viereck: European-American Conscience, 1916–2006," Society, Volume 44, Issue 2, January 2007.
 Jacobsen, Josephine. "Peter Viereck: Durable Poet," The Massachusetts Review, Vol. 9, No. 3, Summer, 1968.
 Lacey, Robert J. "Peter Viereck: Reverent Conservative." in Lacey, Pragmatic Conservatism: Edmund Burke and His American Heirs (Palgrave Macmillan,  2016). 157-195.
 Reiss, Tom. "The First Conservative: How Peter Viereck Inspired—and Lost—a Movement." The New Yorker 24 (2005).
 Ryn, Claes G. "Peter Viereck: Unajusted Man of Ideas," The Political Science Reviewer, Volume 7, Number 1, Fall, 1977.
 Ryn, Claes G. "The Legacy of Peter Viereck: His Prose Writings," Humanitas, Volume XIX, Nos. 1 and 2, 2006.
 Sheridan, Earl. "The Classical Conservatism of Peter Viereck," Southeastern Political Review, Volume 23, Issue 1, March 1995.
 Sparling, George R. "Peter Viereck and the Demise of New Conservatism" (Doctoral Dissertation, Georgetown University, 2015) online, with bibliography pp 167-71
 Starliper, Jay Patrick. Aesthetic Origins: Peter Viereck and the Imaginative Sources of Politics, Submitted to the Faculty of the Department of Politics School of Arts and Sciences of the Catholic University of America in Partial Fulfillment of the Requirements for the Degree Doctor of Political Theory, 2012.
 Weinstein, Michael A. "Peter Viereck: Reconciliation and Beyond." HUMANITAS 10.2 (1997). online
 Zdobinski, Patrick L. "Contradictory Views in Peter Viereck's War Poetry," Colonial Academic Alliance Undergraduate Research Journal, Vol. 1, Article 6, 2010.

External links
 
 Biography from Poetry Library
 Peter Viereck: Reconciliation and Beyond Dignity in Old Age: The Poetical Meditations of Peter Viereck National Review Online on Peter Viereck
 The Legacy of Peter Viereck

Obituaries
"Peter Viereck: Conservative US historian of Nazi thought and writer of complex poetry", The Guardian"Peter Viereck, 89; writings helped inspire conservatism", The Boston Globe "Peter Viereck, Poet and Conservative Theorist, Dies at 89", The New York Times, May 19, 2006
Obituaries in the News:Peter R. Viereck - Forbes'' (scroll to bottom)

1916 births
2006 deaths
20th-century American historians
American literary critics
20th-century American poets
American political writers
Horace Mann School alumni
Harvard College alumni
Mount Holyoke College faculty
Pulitzer Prize for Poetry winners
American male poets
American people of German descent
American male non-fiction writers
American anti-communists
Historians from New York (state)
20th-century American male writers
Harvard Graduate School of Arts and Sciences alumni